Pinky Sarkar (born 6 August 1982) better known as Meenakshi, is an Indian actress, who appears in Tamil, Telugu and Malayalam language films. She is probably best known for her performance as Raasathi in her debut film Karuppusamy Kuththagaithaarar.

Career

Debut
Meenakshi first appeared in two Telugu ventures, the historical fiction Hanumanthu  and the devotional film Sri Satyanarayana Swamy, under her birth name Pinky Sarkar; the latter featured her as goddess Lakshmi, with a reviewer from Indiaglitz.com writing that she "failed to emote well".

Breakthrough (2007–2010)
In 2007, she made her Tamil debut in Karuppusamy Kuththagaithaarar, playing the role of Raasathi, a first year medical student. She made an impression in the film and was subsequently flooded with similar girl next door roles. Not wanting to becoming typecast, she rejected all roles, took a break from acting and completed her education before returning to Chennai.

In 2009, she had her next Tamil release, TN 07 AL 4777, which was a remake of the Hindi film Taxi No. 9211. She played the role of Pooja, a "rich extrovert and party loving cosmopolitan girl", for which she went in for a fashion makeover. That year, she starred in two more Tamil films, Sundar C.'s Perumal and Raghava Lawrence's Rajadhi Raja, besides making a special appearance in a third, Vishal's Thoranai; however all films were box office failures. The following year, she was seen in Karu Pazhaniappan's Mandhira Punnagai and Agam Puram, after which she did not act for over three years as she was pursuing her MBA degree and taking care of her father who was not well.

Work after sabbatical (2014–present)
In 2014, she took up a lead role in Villangam and a supporting role in Vetrimaaran's Soodhadi besides agreeing to perform in a special song in Ezhil's Vellaikaara Durai.

Filmography
 All films are in Tamil; otherwise language noted.

References

Actresses in Telugu cinema
Indian film actresses
Actresses in Tamil cinema
Living people
Bengali actresses
Actresses in Malayalam cinema
Actresses from Kolkata
21st-century Indian actresses
1988 births